The British singer Leona Lewis has received 36 awards from 69 nominations. She is the winner of the third series of The X Factor in the UK and has released five studio albums. She has released twenty-five singles, five of which have reached number one in various singles charts.

Lewis has received nominations in a variety of awards, including seven nominations for BRIT Awards, three nominations for Grammy Awards, two MOBO Awards, two MTV Europe Music Awards and two Teen Choice Awards nominations.  Her international breakthrough single, "Bleeding Love", received a total of ten awards from 16 nominations. Her debut studio album, Spirit, won two awards from six nominations. In 2015, Lewis won a Music Pioneer Award on Women's Entrepreneurship Day, at the United Nations.

APRA Awards

|-
|2009
|"Bleeding Love"
|Most Played Foreign Work
|
|}

Bambi Awards

|-
|2008
|Leona Lewis
|Shooting Star
|
|}

BEFFTA Awards

|-
|2009
|Leona Lewis
|Best Female Act
|
|}

Billboard Year End Award

|-
|2008
|Leona Lewis
|Best New Artist
|
|}

BRIT Awards
The BRIT Awards are the British Phonographic Industry's annual pop music awards. Lewis has received seven nominations across four years, including three nominations in the British Single category. In 2008, Lewis was the favourite to win the most awards.

|-
| 
| "A Moment Like This"
| British Single
|rowspan=7 
|-
|rowspan=4|
|rowspan=2| Leona Lewis
| British Female Solo Artist
|-
|British Breakthrough Act
|-
|Spirit
|British Album
|-
|"Bleeding Love"
|British Single
|-
|
|"Better in Time"
|British Single
|-
|
|Leona Lewis
|British Female Solo Artist
|-

Britain's Best Awards

|-
|2008
|Leona Lewis
|Music Award
|
|}

Capital Awards

|-
|2008
|Leona Lewis
|Favourite UK Female Artist
|
|}

CMT Music Awards

|-
|2016
|"Girl Crush" with Adam Lambert
|CMT Performance of the Year
|
|}

Cosmopolitan Awards

|-
|2009
|Leona Lewis
|Ultimate Music Star
|
|}

Cosmopolitan Ultimate Woman of the Year

|-
|2007
|Leona Lewis
|Newcomer of the Year
|
|}

Gaygalan Awards
Since 1999, the Gaygalan Awards are a Swedish accolade presented by the QX magazine. Lewis has received one nomination.

!
|-
| 2009
|"Bleeding Love"
| International Song of the Year
| 
| style="text-align:center;" | 
|-

Glamour Awards

|-
|2008
|Leona Lewis
|UK Solo Artist
|
|}

Grammy Awards
The Grammy Awards are awarded annually by the National Academy of Recording Arts and Sciences of the United States. Lewis has received three nominations and became the first X Factor contestant to be nominated for a Grammy award.

|-
|rowspan=3|2009
|rowspan=2|"Bleeding Love"
|Record of the Year
|rowspan=3 
|-
|Best Female Pop Vocal Performance
|-
|Spirit
|Best Pop Vocal Album
|-

HITO Awards

|-
|2009
|"Bleeding Love"
|Best Western Song
|
|}

Japan Gold Disc Awards

|-
|2009
|Leona Lewis
|New Artist of the Year
|
|}

MOBO Awards

|-
|rowspan="3"|2008
|Spirit
|Best Album
|rowspan=2 
|-
|"Bleeding Love"
|Best Video
|-
|Leona Lewis
|Best UK Female
|rowspan=2 
|-
|2010
|Leona Lewis
|Best UK Act

MTV Awards

MTV Video Music Awards
The MTV Video Music Awards is an annual awards ceremony established in 1984 by MTV. Lewis has received one nomination.

|-
|2008
|"Bleeding Love"
|Best UK Video
|

MTV Europe Music Awards

|-
|rowspan=4|2008
|rowspan=3|Leona Lewis
|Best UK + Ireland Act
|
|-
|Act of 2008
|rowspan=4 
|-
|Europe's Favourite
|-
|Spirit
|Album of the Year
|-
|2009
|Leona Lewis
|Best Female
|-
|2017
|For the Artists for Grenfell initiative
|Power of Music Award
|

MTV Asia Awards
MTV Asia Awards is another annual award established in 2002 by MTV. Lewis has won one award.

|-
| 2008
| Leona Lewis
| Breakthrough Artist
|

MTV Video Music Awards Japan

|-
| rowspan="2" | 2010 
| "Happy"
| Best Pop Video
|rowspan=2 
|-
| "I See You"
| Best Video from a Film

Music Week Awards

|-
|2022
|Leona Lewis
|Catalogue Marketing Campaign
|
|}

NAACP Image Awards

|-
|2009
|Leona Lewis
|Outstanding New Artist
|
|}

NewNowNext Awards

|-
|2008
|Leona Lewis
|The Kylie Award: Next International Crossover
|
|}

New Music Weekly Awards

|-
|2008
|Leona Lewis
|Top 40 New Artist of the Year
|
|}

Nickelodeon UK Kids Choice Awards 

|-
|2008
|"Bleeding Love"
|Favourite Song
|
|}

NME Awards 

|-
|2008
|Spirit
|Worst Album
|
|}

NRJ Music Awards 

|-
| style="text-align:center;" rowspan="3"| 2009
| Leona Lewis
| International New Artist of the Year
|

PETA

|-
|2008
|Leona Lewis
|Person of the Year
|
|}

PETA - Sexiest Vegetarian Alive Awards

|-
|2009
|Leona Lewis
|Sexiest Vegetarian Celebrity 2009
|
|}

Popjustice 20 Quid Music Prize

|-
| 2014
| "One More Sleep"
| Best British Pop Single
|

Record of the Year 

|-
|2007
|"Bleeding Love"
|The Record of the Year
|
|}

Swiss Music Awards 

|-
|2009
|Leona Lewis
|Best International Newcomer
|
|}

Teen Choice Awards

|-
|rowspan="2"|2008
|Leona Lewis
|Choice Music: Breakthrough Artist
|rowspan=2 
|-
|"Bleeding Love"
|Choice Music: Love Song

UK Music Video Awards

|-
|2008
|"Bleeding Love"
|People's Choice Award
|
|}

Urban Music Awards

|-
|rowspan="2"|2008
|Spirit
|Best Album 2008
|rowspan=2 
|-
|Leona Lewis
|Best R&B Act

Vh1 Video of the Year

|-
|2008
|"Bleeding Love"
|Best Video
|
|}

Virgin Media Music Awards

|-
|2007
|"Bleeding Love"
|Best Track
|rowspan=2 
|-
|2008
|Leona Lewis
|Best UK Act

VEVOCertified Awards
The VEVOCertified Awards is an rewarding the music videos that reached the mark of 100 million views on YouTube.

|-
| style="text-align:center;" rowspan="1"|2012
| rowspan="1"|"Bleeding Love"
| 100.000.000 Views
|rowspan=3 
|-
| style="text-align:center;" rowspan="1"|2015
| rowspan="1"|"Bleeding Love" US version
| 100.000.000 Views
|-
| style="text-align:center;" rowspan="1"|2017
| rowspan="1"|"Better in Time" 
| 100.000.000 Views

Women's Entrepreneurship Day

|-
|2015
|Leona Lewis
|Music Pioneer Award
|
|}

World Music Awards

|-
|rowspan=3|2008
|rowspan=6|Leona Lewis
|Best Pop Female
|rowspan=2 
|-
|Best New Artist
|-
|Best Selling R&B Female
|rowspan=6 
|-
|rowspan=5|2014
|World's Best Female Artist
|-
|World's Best Live Act
|-
|World's Best Entertainer
|-
|rowspan="2" | "One More Sleep"
|World's Best Song
|-
|World's Best Video
|-

Footnotes
1.  From those outlined in side table only

References

Lewis, Leona
Awards and nominations